Paraburkholderia is a genus of Pseudomonadota  that are gram negative, slightly curved rods that are motile by means of flagella. They have been reported to colonize endophytic tissues of hybrid spruce (Picea glauca x engelmannii) and lodgepole pine with a strong potential to perform biological nitrogen fixation and plant growth promotion. Unlike Burkholderia species, Paraburkholderia members are not commonly associated with human infection. Paraburkholderia members form a monophyletic clade within the Burkholderiaceae  family, which is what prompted their distinction as a genus independent from Burkholderia species, in combination with the finding of robust conserved signature indels which are unique to Paraburkholderia species, and are lacking in members of the genus Burkholderia. These CSIs distinguish the genus from all other bacteria. Additionally, the CSIs that were found to be shared by Burkholderia species are absent in Paraburkholderia, providing evidence of separate lineages.

Conserved signature indels have also been found within the genus Paraburkholderia. These CSIs are in parallel with phylogenomic analyses that indicate to two monophyletic clades within the genus; one clade harbours unnamed and Candidatus Paraburkholderia, while the other clade is inclusive of environmental Paraburkholderia, commonly used for agricultural purposes.  CSIs have been found exclusive to each of these clades, and have not been found specific for any other combination of Paraburkholderia species, providing an additional level of phylogenetic resolution within the genus level.

Species
Paraburkholderia comprises the following species:

Paraburkholderia atlantica
Paraburkholderia acidipaludis
Paraburkholderia agricolaris

Paraburkholderia aromaticivorans
Paraburkholderia aspalathi
Paraburkholderia azotifigens
Paraburkholderia bannensis
Paraburkholderia bryophila
Paraburkholderia caballeronis
Paraburkholderia caffeinilytica
Paraburkholderia caledonica
Paraburkholderia caribensis
Paraburkholderia caryophylli
Paraburkholderia denitrificans
Paraburkholderia diazotrophica
Paraburkholderia dilworthii
Paraburkholderia dipogonis
Paraburkholderia eburnea 
Paraburkholderia elongata 
Paraburkholderia endofungorum
Paraburkholderia ferrariae
Paraburkholderia franconis
Paraburkholderia fungorum
Paraburkholderia ginsengisoli
Paraburkholderia ginsengiterrae

Paraburkholderia graminis

Paraburkholderia guartelaensis
Paraburkholderia heleia
Paraburkholderia hiiakae
Paraburkholderia hospita

Paraburkholderia humisilvae
Paraburkholderia jirisanensis
Paraburkholderia kirstenboschensis
Paraburkholderia insulsa
Paraburkholderia kururiensis
Paraburkholderia madseniana
Paraburkholderia megapolitana
Paraburkholderia metalliresistens
Paraburkholderia metrosideri
Paraburkholderia mimosarum
Paraburkholderia monticola
Paraburkholderia nodosa
Paraburkholderia oxyphila
Paraburkholderia pallidirosea

Paraburkholderia paradisi
Paraburkholderia peleae
Paraburkholderia phenazinium
Paraburkholderia phenoliruptrix
Paraburkholderia phymatum
Paraburkholderia phytofirmans
Paraburkholderia piptadeniae
Paraburkholderia rhizosphaerae
Paraburkholderia rhizoxinica
Paraburkholderia rhynchosiae
Paraburkholderia ribeironis
Paraburkholderia sabiae
Paraburkholderia sacchari
Paraburkholderia sartisoli
Paraburkholderia sediminicola
Paraburkholderia silvatlantica
Paraburkholderia soli
Paraburkholderia solisilvae
Paraburkholderia solitsugae 

Paraburkholderia sprentiae
Paraburkholderia steynii
Paraburkholderia strydomiana
Paraburkholderia susongensis
Paraburkholderia symbiotica
Paraburkholderia terrae
Paraburkholderia terricola
Paraburkholderia tropica
Paraburkholderia tuberum
Paraburkholderia unamae
Paraburkholderia xenovorans
Paraburkholderia youngii

References

 
Burkholderiaceae
Bacteria genera